A Home of Your Own is a 1964 British comedy film, which is a brick-by-brick account of the building of a young couple's dream house. From the day when the site is first selected, to the day – several years and children later – when the couple finally move in, the story is a noisy but wordless comedy of errors, as the incompetent labourers struggle to complete the house.

In the 2006 interview included on the DVD's box set release, the Producer said the film's idea was not his own, but came from a comic idea to "De-prestige" a building company's vainglorious promotional film he and the Writers had watched.

In this satirical look at British builders, many cups of tea are made, windows are broken and the same section of road is dug up over and over again by the water board, the electricity board and the gas board.

Ronnie Barker's repeatedly ruined cementing; Peter Butterworth's short-sighted carpenter, and Bernard Cribbins’ hapless stonemason all contribute to the ensuing chaos.

The film was released on Blu-ray in 2021 as part of Futtocks End and Other Short Stories, an anthology of short films produced by Kellet, also including San Ferry Ann and Vive le Sport.

Cast
Ronnie Barker as the Cement Mixer
Richard Briers as the Husband
Peter Butterworth as the Carpenter
Bernard Cribbins as the Stonemason
Bill Fraser as the Shop Steward
Norman Mitchell as the Foreman
Ronnie Stevens as the Architect
Fred Emney as the Mayor

Also starring
Janet Brown
Gerald Campion
Bridget Armstrong
George Benson
Douglas Ives
Jack Melford
Thelma Ruby
Tony Tanner
Aubrey Woods
Helen Cotterill
Barrie Gosney
Harry Locke
Thorley Walters
Henry Woolf

External links 
 

1964 films
British comedy films
1964 comedy films
1960s British films